Triphaenopsis is a genus of moths of the family Noctuidae.

Species
 Triphaenopsis cinerescens Butler, 1855
 Triphaenopsis diminuta Butler, 1889
 Triphaenopsis ella Strand, 1920
 Triphaenopsis indica (Moore, 1881)
 Triphaenopsis inepta Butler, 1889
 Triphaenopsis insolita Remm, 1983
 Triphaenopsis jezoensis Sugi, 1962
 Triphaenopsis lucilla Butler, 1878
 Triphaenopsis postflava (Leech, 1900)

References
Natural History Museum Lepidoptera genus database
Triphaenopsis at funet

Hadeninae